Gillian "Jill" Atkins (born 30 May 1963) is a former field hockey player, who was a member of the British squad that won the bronze medal at the 1992 Summer Olympics in Barcelona. She competed in three consecutive Summer Olympics, starting in 1988.

Her father is Denis Atkins, a footballer who played for Huddersfield Town and Bradford City.

External links
 
 
 
 
 

1963 births
Living people
English female field hockey players
Field hockey players at the 1988 Summer Olympics
Field hockey players at the 1992 Summer Olympics
Field hockey players at the 1996 Summer Olympics
Olympic field hockey players of Great Britain
British female field hockey players
Olympic bronze medallists for Great Britain
Olympic medalists in field hockey
Medalists at the 1992 Summer Olympics
People educated at Prince Henry's Grammar School, Otley